Thomas Knox (1588–1628) was a Scottish prelate from the 17th century who served as Bishop of the Isles.

Life

He was born in 1588 the son of Andrew Knox, Bishop of the Isles, and Elizabeth ("Bessie") Knox, his cousin. He was educated at Glasgow University graduating MA in 1608.

He received crown provision to the Deanery of the Isles on 4 August 1617 and started serving as a minister on Tiree in 1618. He is the first Dean of the Isles to be known by name (apart from the famous Dean Monro, a century earlier), though an unnamed cathedral dean was recorded in 1572, and the "dean and chapter of Iona" are attested again on 5 June 1576.

On 24 February 1619 he was granted crown provision to succeed his father as Bishop of the Isles, his father later becoming Bishop of Raphoe in Ireland. Thomas Knox's last historical appearance dates to 1 November 1627, a year later than the date given by Robert Keith. He had died by 3 April 1628, meaning he almost certainly died earlier in that year or at most in 1627.

Family and  descendants

He married in 1625 Prudence Benson, daughter of the wealthy builder and architect Peter Benson of  London, who moved to Ireland, oversaw the building of the Walls of Derry, and played a prominent role in the Plantation of Ulster. Her mother was probably his first wife, Jane Hobson of Lincolnshire. Thomas and Prudence had a son, also named Thomas. Her father, who died in 1642, left legacies to Prudence and her son. The eventual heiress of the family Catherine Knox married John Grogan of Johnstown Castle, County Wexford, in about 1736 and was the mother of the United Irishman Cornelius Grogan, who was hanged for his part in the Irish Rebellion of 1798.

References

 
 

1588 births
1620s deaths
Bishops of the Isles